Mait Mäekivi (born on 8 January 1959 in Kohtla-Järve) is an Estonian cinematographer.

1982-1988 he studied at Gerasimov Institute of Cinematography. 1986-1991 he worked at Tallinnfilm. From 1991 he is a freelance cinematographer.

In 2007 he was awarded with Order of the White Star, V class.

Filmography

 "Ringhoov" (1987)
 "Äratus" (1989)
 "Vanad ja kobedad saavad jalad alla" (2003)
 "Vanameeste paradiis" (2005)
 "Stiilipidu" (2005)

References

Living people
1959 births
Estonian cinematographers
Recipients of the Order of the White Star, 5th Class
People from Kohtla-Järve